William Wyatt may refer to:

William Wyatt (cricketer) (1842–1908), English cricketer
William Wyatt (scholar) (1616–1685), English scholar
William Wyatt (settler) (1804–1886), Australian settler
William Wyatt (weightlifter) (1893–1989), British weightlifter

See also
Bill Wyatt (born 1938), Australian basketball player
Will Wyatt (born 1942), British television producer
Willie Wyatt (born 1967), American football player